Scorzonera laciniata, also known as cutleaf vipergrass, is a species of herb in the family Asteraceae.

Sources

References 

Cichorieae